E. R. Eswaran is an Indian politician and entrepreneur from Tamil Nadu.  he is the General Secretary of the Kongunadu Makkal Desia Katchi party and as of 2021, is a Member of the Tamil Nadu Legislative Assembly from the Tiruchengode constituency.

Early life and education
Eswaran was born at Kokarayanpettai, near Thiruchengode in the Namakkal district of Tamil Nadu. He is a member of the Kongu Vellalar Gounder community and his family are involved in agriculture.

He received a Bachelor of Mechanical Engineering degree from Government Engineering College, Salem. He then began his business in Assam and later moved on to Chennai where he entered the construction and infrastructure business. He soon "established himself as one of the premier builders in Chennai, promoting many apartments and townships". He also has business interests in the manufacture and export of clothing, which has caused him to travel abroad extensively.

He is fluent in Tamil, English and Hindi.

Association with Kongu organisations
He was secretary of "Kongu Nanbargal Sangam" around 2001.

Political career
On 21 March 2013, Eswaran was one of the founders of Kongunadu Makkal Desia Katchi, and is General Secretary of the party. He is member of the Tamil Nadu Legislative Assembly from the   Tiruchengode constituency.The presence of KMDK in DMK-led alliance has worked in favour of DMK. E.R. Eswaran won by a margin of 2,862 votes in Tiruchengode. He contested the May 2009 Lok Sabha Elections as a KMDK candidate from the Coimbatore constituency and came third, securing more than one hundred thousand votes. He also came third in the 2009 by election for the Thondamuthur Assembly Constituency.
For Lok sabha elections 2014, he contested in Pollachi Constituency as the KMDK candidate with BJP alliance. E.R. Eswaran secured 2,76,118 votes.

References

Living people
1961 births
People from Tamil Nadu
National Democratic Alliance candidates in the 2014 Indian general election
Tamil Nadu MLAs 2021–2026

ta:கொங்கு வேளாளர்